The 1st Signal Regiment is a deployable signals regiment of the Italian Army based in Milan in Lombardy. In 1906 the unit was formed in Rome as a detached brigade of the 3rd Engineer Regiment (Telegraphers) and tasked with training the army's wireless telegraphy personnel. In 1912 the unit was tasked to train the wireless telegraphy personnel of the Military Aviation Corps. In 1919 the battalion was expanded to Radio-Telegraphers Engineer Regiment, which in 1926 split to form the 1st Radio-Telegraphers Regiment and 2nd Radio-Telegraphers Regiment. Both regiment were disbanded in 1932.

The unit was reformed in 1948 as a battalion. In 1950 the battalion was given number III, which had been used by two battalions active during World War II. During the Cold War the battalion was assigned to the III Army Corps. In 1975 the battalion was named for the Splügen Pass and assigned the flag and traditions of the 1st Radio-Telegraphers Regiment. In 1995 the battalion entered the newly formed 1st Signal Regiment. In 2001 the regiment reformed the Battalion "Sempione" as its second signal battalion. The regiment is assigned to the army's NRDC-ITA Support Brigade, which supports the NATO Rapid Deployable Corps – Italy.

History 
On 24 February 1906 the 3rd Engineer Regiment (Telegraphers)'s Specialists Brigade in Rome formed a Radio-Telegraphers Section. In 1909 the brigade became autonomous and in March 1911 it was renamed Specialists Battalion. In 1911-12 the battalion provided ten radio-telegraphic stations for the Italo-Turkish War. In August 1912 the task of training the personnel of the radio-telegraphic service was transferred to the 3rd Engineer Regiment (Telegraphers), with the Specialists Battalion continuing to train the radio-telegraphic personnel for the army's Military Aviation Corps.

World War I 
At the outbreak of World War I the 3rd Engineer Regiment (Telegraphers) mobilized nine radio-telegraphers sections for service on the Italian front. During the war a further 18 sections were formed. In 1918 the Army General Staff ordered the radio-telegraphic services of the army and military aviation corps to merge. Consequently on 1 July 1918 the Radio-Telegraphers became a speciality of the Royal Italian Army's Engineer Corps and on the same date a Radio-Telegraphers Battalion was formed in Tivoli. The battalion was assigned to the 3rd Engineer Regiment (Telegraphers) and received the 27 radio-telegraphers sections the regiment had formed. The battalion also received a train section and a automobile squad. The battalion immediately began to train personnel for 23 radio-telegraphers sections destined for the army's 23 army corps, but the war ended before the training had been completed.

Interwar years 
On 21 November 1919 the Radio-Telegraphers Engineer Regiment was formed in Rome. The new regiment united all radio-telegraphers units of the army and consisted of a command, five battalions, a depot in Rome, four branch depots in Mestre, Florence, Piacenza, and Palermo, and the Special Radio-Telegraphers Section for Sardinia, which was based in Cagliari. The regiment's five battalions were based in Rome, Mestre, Florence, Piacenza, and Palermo and consisted of two radio-telegraphers companies each. In the next years the regiment added a sixth battalion and the battalions repeatedly changed location.

On 15 November 1926 the regiment was renamed 1st Radio-Telegraphers Regiment and split to form the next day the 2nd Radio-Telegraphers Regiment in Florence, which received the I, III, and VI battalions. After the split the 1st Radio-Telegraphers Regiment formed two new battalions and then consisted of a command, the I, II, and III battalions in Rome, the IV Battalion in Naples, the V Battalion in Palermo, the Radio-Telegraphers Company for Sardinia in Cagliari, a depot in Rome, and two branch depots in Naples and Palermo. Each of the five battalions consisted of two companies.

On 28 October 1932 both radio-telegraphers regiments were disbanded and the units of the 1st Radio-Telegraphers Regiment were distributed among the army's engineer regiments as follows:
 I Battalion -> 7th Engineer Regiment
 II Battalion -> 6th Engineer Regiment
 III Battalion -> 8th Engineer Regiment
 IV Battalion -> 10th Engineer Regiment
 9th Company/ V Battalion -> 9th Engineer Regiment
 10th Company/ V Battalion -> 12th Engineer Regiment
 Radio-Telegraphers Company for Sardinia -> Mixed Engineer Sardinia

The 1st Radio-Telegraphers Regiment depot and depot personnel were used to from the 2nd Miners Regiment.

Cold War 
On 1 December 1948 a Connections Battalion was formed in Milan as support unit of the III Territorial Military Command. In March 1950 the battalion was numbered III Connections Battalion and became the spiritual successor of the III Telegraphers Battalion and III Marconists Battalion, which had been formed by the 6th Engineer Regiment during World War II. On 1 October 1952 the Connections Speciality became an autonomous speciality of the Engineer Arm, with its own school and gorget patches. On 16 May 1953 the speciality adopted the name Signal Speciality and consequently the III Connections Battalion was renamed III Signal Battalion on the same date. On 25 January 1954 the battalion was renamed III Army Corps Signal Battalion and consisted of a command, an operations company, a line construction company, and a signal center.

During the 1975 army reform the army disbanded the regimental level and newly independent battalions were granted for the first time their own flags. During the reform signal battalions were renamed for mountain passes. On 1 September 1975 the III Army Corps Signal Battalion was renamed 3th Signal Battalion "Spluga" and assigned the flag and traditions of the 1st Radio-Telegraphers Regiment.

The 3rd Signal Battalion "Spluga" consisted of a command, a command and services platoon, three signal companies, and a repairs and recovery platoon. On 23 May 1976 the flag of the 1st Radio-Telegraphers Regiment arrived in Milan and was transferred to the custody of the battalion. In August 1977 the battalion formed a fourth signal company.

In March 1989 the battalion was reorganized and consisted now of a command, a command and services company, a radio relay company, and two signal center companies. In March 1991 the battalion added a second radio relay company.

Recent times 
With the drawdown of forces after the end of the Cold War the battalion incorporated the personnel and materiel of the 231st Signal Battalion "Sempione", which was disbanded on 15 May 1991. On 15 October 1995 the 3rd Signal Battalion "Spluga" lost its autonomy and the next day the battalion entered the newly formed 1st Signal Regiment as Battalion "Spluga". On the same date the flag and traditions of the 1st Radio-Telegraphers Regiment were transferred from the battalion to the 1st Signal Regiment. The regiment consisted of a command, a command and services company, and the Battalion "Spluga", which fielded two radio relay companies and two signal center companies.

On 27 August 2001 the regiment received the reformed Battalion "Sempione" and became a projection signal regiment capable to deploy and operate outside Italy. On 1 November 2001 the regiment was assigned to the Signal Brigade of the NATO Rapid Deployable Corps – Italy.

Current structure 
As of 2022 the 1st Signal Regiment consists of:
  Regimental Command, in Milan
 Command and Logistic Support Company
 Battalion "Spluga"
 1st Signal Company
 2nd Signal Company
 3rd Signal Company
 Battalion "Sempione"
 4th Signal Company
 5th Signal Company
 6th Signal Company

The Command and Logistic Support Company fields the following platoons: C3 Platoon, Transport and Materiel Platoon, Medical Platoon, and Commissariat Platoon.

External links
 Italian Army Website: 1° Reggimento Trasmissioni

References

Signal Regiments of Italy